The 2008–09 Liga de Nuevos Talentos season was split in two tournaments Apertura and Clausura. Liga de Nuevos Talentos was the fourth-tier football league of Mexico. The season was played between 29 August 2008 and 23 May 2009. 

As of this season, the Segunda División de México was divided into different branches: the Liga Premier de Ascenso for the more developed teams that have aspirations for promotion to Liga de Ascenso and the Liga de Nuevos Talentos for those clubs with less infrastructure.

Teams

Sureste Zone

Bajío Zone 
{{Location map+ |Mexico |width=650|float=right |caption=Location of teams in the 2008–09 LNT Group 2 |places=

Noroeste Zone

Torneo Apertura

Regular season

Sureste Zone

League table

Results

Bajío Zone
 Note: Mapaches de Nueva Italia was registered in the tournament and participated in the first half of the tournament, however in October 2008 it was disenrolled by the FMF because its owners did not attend various subpoenas from the federation.

League table

Results

Noroeste Zone

League table

Results

Liguilla

Liguilla de Ascenso

Quarter-finals

First leg

Second leg

Semi-finals

First leg

Second leg

Final

First leg

Second leg

Liguilla de Filiales

Group 1

Group 2

Final

First leg

Second leg

Torneo Clausura

Regular season

Sureste Zone

League table

Results

Bajío Zone

League table

Results

Noroeste Zone

League table

Results

Liguilla

Liguilla de Ascenso

Quarter-finals

First leg

Second leg

Semi-finals

First leg

Second leg

Final

First leg

Second leg

Liguilla de Filiales

Group 1

Group 2

Final

First leg

Second leg

Relegation Table 

Last updated: 18 April 2009 Source: Liga Premier FMFP = Position; G = Games played; Pts = Points; Pts/G = Ratio of points to games played

Promotion Final 
The Promotion Final is a series of matches played by the champions of the tournaments Apertura and Clausura, the game was played to determine the winning team of the promotion to Liga Premier de Ascenso. The first leg was played on 20 May 2009, and the second leg was played on 23 May 2009.

First leg

Second leg

See also 
Primera División de México Apertura 2008
Primera División de México Clausura 2009
2008–09 Primera División A season
2008–09 Liga Premier de Ascenso season

References

External links 
 Official website of Liga Premier
 Magazine page  

 
1